Richard Waddell may refer to:

 Ricky Waddell (born 1981), Scottish footballer
 Richard W. Waddell (1922–2016), American politician in the state of South Dakota